Nebria macrodera is a species of ground beetle in the Nebriinae subfamily that is endemic to Italy.

References

macrodera
Beetles described in 1903
Beetles of Europe
Endemic fauna of Italy